Diamond in the Riff is a 2008 album by Terry Silverlight, featuring pianist/composer Barry Miles, bassist Will Lee, and David Mann, Aaron Heick, Glenn Alexander, Tabitha Fair, Lew Soloff, Bob Malach, Larry Farrell and Allan Molnar.

The All About Jazz reviewer commented that, "While it seems most jazz players today are trying to capture something that predates or postdates true jazz fusion, Silverlight is happy to seize upon that sound, circa something 1976–1989, before 'smooth jazz' took over this art form."

Track listing
All tracks composed by Terry Silverlight; except where indicated
 "Nature Drum"
 "Boulevard"
 "Diamond in the Riff"
 "Nothing Like Today"
 "The Velvet Room"
 "Do It"
 "Monkey Dance"
 "Tom Boy"
 "Plaza Mexico" (Barry Miles)
 "For The Rest of My Life"
 "Earth Blue"
 "Freetom"
 "PT"
 "Vinyl Song"

Personnel 
 Terry Silverlight: drums, percussion, vocals on "Nothing Like Today", keyboards except piano and Minimoog
 Barry Miles: acoustic piano throughout and Minimoog on "Diamond In The Riff"
 Will Lee: bass
 David Mann: saxophone
 Aaron Heick: saxophone
 Glenn Alexander: guitar
 Tabitha Fair: vocals
 Lew Soloff: trumpet on "Nothing Like Today"
Bob Malach: saxophone on "Nothing Like Today"
Larry Farrell: trombone on "Nothing Like Today"
Allan Molnar: vibes on "Diamond In The Riff"

References

2008 albums
Jazz albums by American artists